Ululodes macleayanus is a species of owlfly in the tribe Ululodini. It is found in the Caribbean Sea, Central America, North America, and South America.

Subspecies
These two subspecies belong to the species Ululodes macleayanus:
 Ululodes macleayanus macleayanus (Guilding, 1823)
 Ululodes macleayanus sanctaeluciae Van der Weele, 1909

References

Further reading

 

Myrmeleontidae
Articles created by Qbugbot
Insects described in 1823